Mona is a city in Juab County, Utah, United States. As of the 2010 census it had a population of 1,547. It is part of the Provo–Orem metropolitan area.

The city is about halfway between Santaquin and Nephi along Interstate 15. The population was 850 at the 2000 census, which at the time was sufficient under Utah state law for Mona to become a city. It did so in 2001.

A farm owned by Young Living raises  of lavender on the north side of town. Mona is known for its annual Lavender Festival.

History

Mona, one of the early settlements along the old Arrowhead Trail, was originally settled in 1852.  First named Clover Creek for patches of wild clover that grew along the creek in the area, it was later renamed Willow Creek for its water source, then Starr for a local settler, before receiving its present name.

When he was a traveling worker and singer in the early 1930s, Burl Ives was once jailed in Mona for singing "Foggy Foggy Dew", because it was considered bawdy by the authorities.

Geography
Mona is located in northeastern Juab County at  (39.815392, -111.856354). Interstate 15 passes along the eastern edge of the city limits, with access from Exit 233.

Part of the Mona Reservoir is in the northwest corner of the city. The reservoir is an impoundment on Currant Creek, which flows north to Utah Lake.

Demographics

As of the census of 2000, there were 850 people, 232 households, and 203 families residing in the town. The population density was 614.1 people per square mile (237.8/km2). There were 243 housing units at an average density of 175.5 per square mile (68.0/km2). The racial makeup of the town was 98.24% White, 0.35% Native American, 0.12% Asian, 0.12% from other races, and 1.18% from two or more races. Hispanic or Latino of any race were 1.41% of the population.

There were 232 households, out of which 53.0% had children under the age of 18 living with them, 77.2% were married couples living together, 6.9% had a female householder with no husband present, and 12.1% were non-families. 9.9% of all households were made up of individuals, and 6.0% had someone living alone who was 65 years of age or older. The average household size was 3.66 and the average family size was 3.97.

In the town the population was spread out, with 40.7% under the age of 18, 10.2% from 18 to 24, 25.4% from 25 to 44, 16.6% from 45 to 64, and 7.1% who were 65 years of age or older. The median age was 24 years. For every 100 females, there were 95.0 males. For every 100 females age 18 and over, there were 96.1 males.

The median income for a household in the town was $49,464, and the median income for a family was $50,625. Males had a median income of $35,982 versus $22,222 for females. The per capita income for the town was $14,474. About 0.5% of families and 2.4% of the population were below the poverty line, including 2.3% of those under age 18 and none of those age 65 or over.

See also

 List of cities and towns in Utah

References

External links

 

Cities in Juab County, Utah
Cities in Utah
Provo–Orem metropolitan area
Populated places established in 1852
1852 establishments in Utah Territory